Paul Epp  (born 1949 in La Glace, Alberta) is a Canadian professor and industrial designer from Toronto, Ontario.

Career
Epp is a graduate of Sheridan College School of Design. Since 1993 he has been a professor of industrial design at OCAD University in Toronto.

He has focused on the use of wood in design. His work shows a strong influence from Scandinavian design of the 20th century.

He has received the Best of Canada Design Award in 1998. He is also represented at the Canadian Museum of History in Ottawa, Ontario.

Paul Epp is an elected member of the Royal Canadian Academy of Arts (RCA).

References

External links
 http://www.paulepp.com

1949 births
Canadian furniture designers
Canadian industrial designers
Sheridan College alumni
Design educators
Living people
Members of the Royal Canadian Academy of Arts
People from the County of Grande Prairie No. 1
Academic staff of OCAD University